Adly bin Zahari (Jawi: عدلي بن ظهري; born 15 February 1971) is a Malaysian politician who has served as the Deputy Minister of Defence in the Pakatan Harapan (PH) administration under Prime Minister Anwar Ibrahim and Minister Mohamad Hasan since December 2022, Member of Parliament for Alor Gajah since November 2022 and Member of the Malacca State Legislative Assembly (MLA) for Bukit Katil since May 2018. He served as the 11th Chief Minister of Melaka from May 2018 to March 2020 and State Leader of the Opposition of Melaka from April 2020 to December 2022. He is a member of the National Trust Party (AMANAH), a component party of the Pakatan Harapan (PH) coalition. In AMANAH, he has served as its Vice-President since September 2021 and State Chairman of Malacca since August 2017.

Education and early career
Adly obtained his Bachelor of Engineering (BEng) in electrical engineering from Universiti Teknologi Malaysia (UTM). He became an engineer, served in the corporate sector and started his own business before joining the politics.

Political career

He was a member of the Malaysian Islamic Party (PAS) prior to joining its new splinter party AMANAH in 2015.

Adly contested and won the Malacca state seat of Bukit Katil in the 2018 Malacca state election and 2021 Malacca state election. He was sworn in as Chief Minister before Yang di-Pertua Negeri of Malacca Mohd Khalil Yaakob at Dewan Seri Utama, Seri Negeri, in Ayer Keroh on 11 May 2018 after PH won a simple majority in the Malacca legislative assembly to form the new state government when it captured 15 of the 28 state seats in the general election on 9 May 2018.

Election results

References

1971 births
Living people
People from Malacca
Malaysian people of Malay descent
Malaysian Muslims
Malaysian engineers
Malaysian businesspeople
National Trust Party (Malaysia) politicians
Former Malaysian Islamic Party politicians
Members of the Malacca State Legislative Assembly
Malacca state executive councillors
Chief Ministers of Malacca
Leaders of the Opposition in the Malacca State Legislative Assembly
University of Technology Malaysia alumni
21st-century Malaysian politicians